The Mercyhurst Lakers represented Mercyhurst University in CHA women's ice hockey during the 2014-15 NCAA Division I women's ice hockey season. The Lakers were the regular season champions of the College Hockey America Conference (CHA), and lost the conference tournament final game to RIT.

Standings

Offseason
August 4: Emily Janiga earned an invitation to the 2014 USA Hockey Women's National Festival in Lake Placid, New York.  The festival shall determine the roster of the Under-22 team that shall compete in a three-game series versus the Canadian U22/Development Squad from Aug. 21-24 in Calgary.

Recruiting

Roster

2014–15 Lakers

Schedule

|-
!colspan=12 style=""| Regular Season

|-
!colspan=12 style=""| CHA Tournament

Awards and honors
Molly Byrne, D, 2014-15 All-CHA First Team
Molly Byrne, 2014-15 CHA Best Defenseman
Jenna Dingeldein, F,2014-15 All-CHA Second Team
Emily Janiga, F, 2014-15 All-CHA First Team
Emily Janiga, 2014-15 CHA Player of the Year
Emily Janiga, 2014-15 CHA Scoring Trophy
Emily Janiga, CHA Player of the Month (March 2015) 
Amanda Makela, 2014-15 CHA Goaltender Trophy
Sarah Robello, F, 2014-15 CHA All- Rookie Team

References

Mercyhurst
Mercyhurst Lakers women's ice hockey seasons
Mercy
Mercy